General elections were held in Monaco on 24 January 1988. The result was a victory for the National and Democratic Union, which won all 18 seats in the National Council.

Results

By party

References

Elections in Monaco
Monaco
1988 in Monaco
January 1988 events in Europe